Finland participated at the 2018 Summer Youth Olympics in Buenos Aires, Argentina from 6 October to 18 October 2018.

Athletics

Boys
Track & road events

Field events

Girls
Track & road events

Field events

Diving

Girls

Team

Golf

Individual

Team

Gymnastics

Artistic
Finland qualified one gymnast based on its performance at the 2018 European Junior Championship.

Individual Qualification

Individual Finals

Rhythmic
Finland qualified one rhythmic gymnast based on its performance at the European qualification event.

 Girls' rhythmic individual all-around – 1 quota

Multidiscipline

Judo

Individual

Team

Shooting

Finland qualified one sport shooter based on its performance at the 2017 European Championships.

Individual

Team

Swimming

Boyss

Girls

Mixed

Table tennis

Singles

Team

References

2018 in Finnish sport
Nations at the 2018 Summer Youth Olympics
Finland at the Youth Olympics